Alastair Baxter (born 21 January 1977) is an Australian former rugby union footballer. He played his entire professional career with the Waratahs in Super Rugby. He played in the 2003 and 2007 Rugby World Cups, including the 2003 Final loss to England. Alistair Baxter is a practising architect in Sydney with his wife and three children.

Career
Baxter made his Wallaby debut against the All Blacks during the 2003 Bledisloe Cup. He earnt his 50th test cap against Canada during the 2007 Rugby World Cup, scoring his one and only test try. He has become only the second Australian prop to reach the milestone along with former NSW Waratahs coach Ewen McKenzie. Baxter scored his first Super Rugby try on his 100th appearance for the NSW Waratahs. He is the 3rd most capped Wallaby prop behind Benn Robinson and Ben Alexander. 
Baxter retired from the game in 2011 to pursue a career in architecture. In May 2018 he was appointed as vice-president of NSW Rugby Union.

References

External links
Official website
Alastair Baxter on Twitter
Waratahs profile
Wallabies profile

1977 births
Australian rugby union players
Australia international rugby union players
New South Wales Waratahs players
Living people
Rugby union props
People educated at Sydney Church of England Grammar School
Rugby union players from Sydney